The seventh season of American Ninja Warrior premiered on NBC on May 25, 2015. Hosts Matt Iseman and Akbar Gbaja-Biamila returned for their respective sixth and third seasons while newcomer Kristine Leahy joined as sideline reporter, replacing Jenn Brown. In addition, this season's grand prize was increased from $500,000 to $1,000,000. The season concluded on September 14, 2015.

For the first time in American Ninja Warrior history, a competitor completed Stage 3 of the Las Vegas Finals. Both Geoff Britten and Isaac Caldiero completed Stage 3 and climbed Stage 4 in the allotted time of 30 seconds and achieved "Total Victory." Caldiero made the climb in the faster time and was the first competitor to be awarded the grand prize of $1,000,000. However, the title of "First American Ninja Warrior" was unofficially awarded by the community to Britten for being the first to climb the tower.

Changes
This season's grand prize was doubled from $500,000 to $1,000,000.

Cities

In addition to 6 cities (Venice Beach, Kansas City, Houston, Orlando, Pittsburgh, and San Pedro, (Military)) for both city qualifying and finals, the national finals were once again held in Las Vegas, Nevada.

Obstacles

City Qualifying & Finals

National Finals

City Qualifying

Venice Beach Qualifying

Kansas City Qualifying

Houston Qualifying

Orlando Qualifying

Pittsburgh Qualifying

San Pedro (Military) Qualifying

City Qualifying Leaderboard

Fastest Qualifiers
Kevin Bull had the fastest time on a City Qualifying course this season.

City Finals

Venice Beach Finals
Competitors who advanced to the Vegas Finals are listed below. Obstacles used in the Venice Beach Finals included:

Notes
Nicholas Coolridge was the only person to clear the course as the "POM Run of the Night".
Many people went out on the Hourglass Drop, meaning that most people had to only clear the 5th Obstacle to make it to Vegas, and did not even need to pass all the standard qualifying course obstacles; the only other time this has occurred was during Season 4 during the Northeast Region Finals and that was the last season we saw it as a fifth qualifying obstacle next it became an eighth obstacle after the Salmon Ladder still a ninja killer for American Ninja Warrior Season 8 and 9.
Jessie Graff is only the 4th woman to scale the Warped Wall, and the second to make it to Las Vegas without being a Wild Card (and is the only one to make it this season without being a Wild Card). Graff is also the second woman to clear the Salmon Ladder. Graff is only the second woman to clear the Salmon Ladder, behind Kacy Catanzaro in ANW 6.

Kansas City Finals
Competitors who advanced to the Vegas Finals are listed below. A small rainstorm had passed over earlier, causing some obstacles to be slightly wet and slick.
Obstacles used in the Kansas City Finals included:

Notes
Meagan Martin was the only female in the finals, but she fell on the second obstacle and placed last in the finals. However, she still became a wildcard for Vegas.
Kansas City had the most finishers on any city finals course this year with 3.

Houston Finals
Competitors who advanced to the Vegas Finals are listed below. Obstacles in the Houston Finals included:

Notes
Jeremiah Morgan and Sam Sann were the only 2 finishers of the course.
Sam Sann is the 2nd oldest person to finish a City Finals Course at 48 years old, after Jon Stewart.
The Walking Bar proved to be the most difficult obstacle during the course.

Orlando Finals
Competitors who advanced to the Vegas Finals are listed below. Obstacles used during the Orlando Finals are listed below.

Notes
Adam Arnold and James McGrath were the only two competitors to complete this course.
Cannonball Alley eliminated 11 competitors, almost one-third of the competitors. Only 7 out of 18 competitors who made it that far, advanced to the next obstacle.
The course took place at Universal Studios Orlando.

Pittsburgh Finals
Competitors who advanced to the Vegas Finals are listed below.
Obstacles in the Pittsburgh Finals included:

Notes
Joe Moravsky and Geoff Britten were the only two finishers.
Michelle Warnky was the only female in the Pittsburgh Finals, but failed on Snake Crossing. However, she was wild-carded to the Las Vegas National Finals.
Miles Avery was the oldest man ever to make a City Finals but failed on Snake Crossing as well.

San Pedro (Military) Finals
Military competitors who advanced to the Vegas Finals are listed below.
Obstacles in the San Pedro Finals included:

Notes
The Finals were held in San Pedro, California with the USS Iowa as a backdrop.
Dustin McKinney was the only finisher; he is also the shortest man to ever complete a City Finals course.
Preston Griffall was the first Olympian to advance to Vegas, failing on the Salmon Ladder and placing 13th.

City Finals Leaderboard

Fastest Finalists
James McGrath had the fastest time on a City Finals course this season.

Mount Midoriyama

Stage 1

Competitors who successfully completed Stage 1 in under 2:30.00 are listed below. Competitors in Bold are finishers of the City Finals.  Obstacles used in Stage 1 included:

Stage 1 featured three new obstacles, Sonic Curve, the Coin Flip, and the Triple Swing.

Notes
A record of 38 competitors had completed stage 1, beating the record of 24 in season 4. This record would be beaten in season 9, with 41 competitors.
The Vegas finals had a record 3 finishers (Pavel Fesyuk, David Yarter, and Dustin Rocho) who completed Stage 1 with less than a second left.
Brent Steffensen had the fastest time on the course by 1:38.92.
Brandon Mears is the tallest person to complete Stage 1 in ANW history at 6'5 (195.6 cm).
Dustin McKinney is the shortest person to complete Stage 1 in ANW history at 5'2 (157.5 cm), until Tyler Yamauchi in the show's ninth season.

Stage 2

Stage 2 featured a new obstacle, Roulette Row.

Notes
A record 8 competitors finished Stage 2, but this record would later be beaten in Season 11 when 21 competitors finished the stage.
Geoff Britten had the fastest finish with a time of 2:01.89

Stage 3

Stage 3 featured two new obstacles, Psycho Chainsaw and Area 51.

Notes
Geoff Britten and Isaac Caldiero were the only two finishers in Stage 3.

Stage 4
Isaac Caldiero and Geoff Britten were the first two people to reach Stage 4 in the 7th season of the show. Since there were two competitors, the trophy and $1,000,000 was given to the athlete with the fastest time to climb the tower via a 75-foot rope and hit the buzzer at the top. While Britten was able to hit the buzzer at the top with 0.35 seconds remaining and earn the title of "First American Ninja Warrior", Caldiero hit the buzzer with 3.86 seconds left and earned the title of "Second American Ninja Warrior" and $1,000,000.

U.S. Nielsen Ratings

References

American Ninja Warrior
2015 American television seasons